Portrait is the sixteenth studio album by American jazz guitarist Lee Ritenour, released in 1987 through GRP Records. The album reached No. 7 on the Billboard magazine Contemporary Jazz chart.

Track listing

Personnel
 Lee Ritenour – guitars, SynthAxe
 Jerry Hey – trumpet
 Mark Russo – alto saxophone
 Kenny G – tenor saxophone
 Larry Williams – tenor saxophone, synth, synth programming
 Dave Boroff – synth programming
 Russell Ferrante – keyboards
 Barnaby Finch – midi–piano, keyboards
 Greg Phillinganes – keyboards
 Djavan – rhythm guitar, vocals
 Paul Jackson Jr. – rhythm guitar
 Nathan East – bass
 Jimmy Haslip – bass
 Tim Landers – bass
 Vinnie Colaiuta – drums
 William Kennedy – drums
 Harvey Mason – drums, percussion
 Alex Acuña – percussion
 Paulinho da Costa – percussion
 Phil Perry – vocals
 Eric Tagg – vocals
 Kevyn Lettau – background vocals

Charts

References

External links
Portrait album at Discogs
Lee Ritenour's Official Site

1987 albums
GRP Records albums
Lee Ritenour albums
Portuguese-language albums